Fred Wise (May 27, 1915 – January 18, 1966) was the co-writer of the lyrics to the 1948 song "'A' — You're Adorable" with Buddy Kaye and Sid Lippman. He subsequently wrote many of the songs sung by Elvis Presley in his movies.

Many of his songs were collaborations with Kay Twomey and Ben Weisman, sometimes with additional collaborators. (see "Wooden Heart" and "In the Beginning.")

Selected songs 
 "Follow That Dream"
 "I Got Lucky"

References

Further reading 

 

1915 births
1966 deaths
Songwriters from New York (state)
20th-century American musicians